"Substitute" is a song by the English rock band the Who, written by Pete Townshend. Released in March 1966, the single reached number five in the UK and was later included on the compilation album Meaty Beaty Big and Bouncy in 1971. In 2006, Pitchfork ranked "Substitute" at number 91 on the "200 Greatest Songs of the 1960s".

Inspiration and writing
"Substitute" was primarily inspired by the 1965 soul single "The Tracks of My Tears" by Smokey Robinson and the Miracles. Pete Townshend became obsessed, particularly, with the line, "Although she may be cute/She's just a substitute." This had then led Townshend "to celebrate the word with a song all its own."

The riff used in the song's verses was derived from a November 1965 single by Robb Storme and The Whispers called Where Is My Girl, a fact later acknowledged by Townshend who recalled hearing the record whilst reviewing singles for the Melody Maker.

The guitar solo is played by bassist John Entwistle who later said: "I played a Gibson SG medium scale bass with wire-wound strings. When it got to the solo, because we were recording and mixing it virtually live, I thought, yeah, this should be a bass solo, so I turned my volume up and they couldn't mix me out, so it ended up as a bass solo."

For the American single, released in April 1966, a different vocal take was used that changed the line in the chorus, "I look all white but my dad was black", to "I try walking forward but my feet walk back." The complete second verse and chorus were also edited from the US release, reducing the track's length to two minutes and fifty-nine seconds.

Reception
Cash Box described the song as a "pulsating, fast-moving blues-drenched woeser which concerns a guy who’s miserable ’cause he’s only a stand-in for the fella his girl really wants."

Performance history
The song remains a familiar fan-favourite and was performed at most of their concerts. "Substitute," along with "I Can't Explain," have served as the group's opening numbers since 1971. It appears on the Live at Leeds album, as well as Live at the Isle of Wight Festival 1970.

On the album Live at Leeds, Townshend comments on the song by saying:

In 1976, radio pirates interrupted BBC programmes in the south and southwest of England by overpowering a feeder station in Wrotham, Kent. The fake program, which started at 11:00pm and ran for 35 minutes before government engineers regained control, fittingly began with "Substitute."

Cover versions
Sex Pistols played "Substitute" live on numerous gigs during 1976. A studio version, also recorded in 1976, was released on the 1979 double album The Great Rock 'n' Roll Swindle.

The Ramones included "Substitute," with Pete Townshend contributing backing vocals, on their 1993 all-covers album, Acid Eaters.

Great White recorded a cover and produced a video of this song on their debut album in 1984.

Car Seat Headrest recorded a cover on their MADLO: Influences - EP in 2021 on Matador Records.

Personnel
 Roger Daltrey – lead and backing vocals
 Pete Townshend – acoustic guitar, electric guitar, backing vocals
 John Entwistle – bass guitar, backing vocals
 Keith Moon – drums, percussion

Chart performance

Weekly charts

References

1966 singles
The Who songs
Song recordings produced by Pete Townshend
Songs written by Pete Townshend
Atco Records singles
Reaction Records singles
1966 songs